Recycled Plastik is an extended play by Canadian electronic music producer Richie Hawtin under the alias Plastikman. It was released in 1994 by Novamute Records.

The EP, released a few months before the Plastikman album Musik, features "Spastik", which has been described as "perhaps [Hawtin's] most well-known Plastikman production, a signature track that never ceased to inspire feverish reactions among Hawtin fanatics." The remaining five tracks are likewise rooted in Hawtin's trademark minimal style.

Critical reception

Jason Birchmeier of AllMusic wrote that Recycled Plastik "isn't nearly as thematic or continuous as the other Plastikman releases, [but] it functions well for what it is, an EP intended to showcase 'Spastik' and set the stage for the upcoming Musik album."

Track listing

Personnel
Credits adapted from liner notes.
 Richie Hawtin – music, layout
 Dominic Ayre – logo design

References

External links
 

1994 albums
Richie Hawtin albums
Novamute Records albums